Zhan is the pinyin romanization of several Chinese names, also spelled Chan in the Wade–Giles system common in Taiwan and in older publications

List of people with the surname Zhǎn (展)

Zhan Ziqian ( 6th century), painter and official during the Sui dynasty
Zhan Zhao, fictional Song dynasty hero from the novel The Seven Heroes and Five Gallants
Zhan Wang (born 1962), Chinese sculptor
Zhan Tao (born 1963), Chinese mathematician

List of people with the surname Zhàn (湛)

369	湛	0.0079%	10.50	Hunan

Also spelled 'Cham' based on the Cantonese pronunciation
Zhan Ruoshui (1466–1560), Chinese philosopher
Kim Cham (born 1946), Hong Kong businessman and politician

List of people with the surname Zhān (詹)

127	詹	0.110%	147.00	Guangdong
Also spelled Chim based on the Cantonese pronunciation, Chiem, and Cheam or Chiam based on the Hokkien pronunciation:
 Chan Hao-ching (born 1993), Taiwanese tennis player
 Cheam June Wei (born 1997), Malaysian badminton player
 Chiam See Tong (born 1935), Singaporean politician and lawyer
 Chim Pui-chung (born 1946), Hong Kong politician
 Jim Chim (born 1965), Hong Kong actor and comedian
 Latisha Chan (born 1989), Taiwanese tennis player
 Yuh Nung Jan (born 1945), Chinese-born American neuroscientist
 Zhan Shichai (born 1841), Chinese giant, stage name Chang Woo Gow
 Zhan Silu (born 1961), Chinese bishop
 Zhan Tianyou (born 1861), pioneering Chinese railroad engineer
 Zhan Wenshan (born 1941), Chinese physicist
 Zhan Ziqing (born 1937), Chinese historian
 Yuhao (born 1981) of the Taiwanese group Nan Quan Mama
 Lesley Cheam Wei Yeng (born 1996), Malaysian beauty queen who won the Miss Universe Malaysia 2022

List of people with the surname Zhān (占)

Zhan Xugang (born on 1974), Chinese weightlifter

List of people with the surname Zhàn (战/戰)

Elisa Chan, Taiwan-born American politician
Zhan Yilin (born 1989), Chinese footballer

Chinese-language surnames
Multiple Chinese surnames